Chicken Cannon may refer to:

The NASA Chicken Gun, a device used in aircraft testing
The Chicken Cannon featured on the satirical Canadian television show Royal Canadian Air Farce